Crying Fist is a 2005 South Korean film written and directed by Ryoo Seung-wan.  The film had 1,728,477 admissions nationwide.

It screened in the Directors' Fortnight section of the 2005 Cannes Film Festival.

Cast

 Choi Min-sik as Kang Tae-shik
 Ryoo Seung-bum as Yu Sang-hwan
 Im Won-hee as Won-tae
 Byun Hee-bong as Sang-hwan's coach
 Na Moon-hee as Sang-hwan's grandmother
 Gi Ju-bong as Sang-hwan's father
 Chun Ho-jin as Sang-chul
 Ahn Gil-kang as head warden
 Kim Su-hyeon as Kwon-rok
 Oh Dal-su as Yong-dae
 Seo Hye-rin as Sun-ju
 Lee Joon-gu
 Kim Young-in
 Park Joo-ah
 Kim Byeong-ok as detective Oh

Awards and nominations 
2005 Grand Bell Awards
 Best Supporting Actress -  Na Moon-hee
 Best Editing - Nam Na-yeong
 Special Jury Prize
 Nomination - Best Film
 Nomination - Best Director - Ryoo Seung-wan
 Nomination - Best Actor - Ryoo Seung-bum
 Nomination - Best Screenplay - Ryoo Seung-wan and Jeon Cheol-hong
 Nomination - Best Cinematography - Jo Yong-gyu
 Nomination - Best Lighting - Jeong Seong-cheol
 Nomination - Best Music - Bang Jun-seok
 Nomination - Best Visual Effects - Lee Jeon-hyeong (EON), Shin Joo-hee, Jang Jong-gyu, Jo Sung-jae, Jeong Do-an (Demolition)
 Nomination - Best Sound - Jeong Gun, Kim Suk-won (Blue Cap)
 Nomination - Best Planning - Im Seung-yong, Park Jae-hyeong

2005 Blue Dragon Film Awards
 Nomination - Best Actor - Ryoo Seung-bum

2005 Korean Film Awards
 Nomination - Best Film
 Nomination - Best Director - Ryoo Seung-wan
 Nomination - Best Actor - Ryoo Seung-bum
 Nomination - Best Supporting Actress - Na Moon-hee
 Nomination - Best Screenplay - Ryoo Seung-wan and Jeon Cheol-hong
 Nomination - Best Editing - Nam Na-yeong

2005 Busan Film Critics Awards
 Best Director - Ryoo Seung-wan

References

External links
 
 
 
 
 Crying Fist at Evokative Films

2005 films
2000s sports drama films
South Korean sports drama films
South Korean anthology films
2000s Korean-language films
South Korean boxing films
Films shot in Seoul
Films directed by Ryoo Seung-wan
2005 drama films
2000s South Korean films